Prynne is a surname. Notable people with the surname include::

 William Prynne (1600–1669), English Puritan statesman
 George Fellowes Prynne (1853–1927), British architect
 J. H. Prynne (born 1936), British poet
 Hester Prynne, the protagonist of the novel The Scarlet Letter